Walter Antonio Jiménez De Simoni (25 May 1939 – 19 January 2023) was an Argentine footballer who played as a forward for clubs of Argentina and Chile and the Argentina national team in the 1962 FIFA World Cup qualification.

Career
 Independiente 1955–1962
 Colo-Colo 1963–1966
 Audax Italiano 1967
 Deportes Concepción 1968
 Palestino 1969
 Audax Italiano 1970–1971

Honours
Independiente
 Argentine Primera División: 1960

Colo-Colo
 Chilean Primera División: 1963

Argentina
 Panamerican Championship: 1960

References

External links
 

1939 births
2023 deaths
Argentine footballers
Association football forwards
Argentina international footballers
Argentine Primera División players
Club Atlético Independiente footballers
Audax Italiano footballers
Colo-Colo footballers
Argentine expatriate footballers
Argentine expatriate sportspeople in Chile
Expatriate footballers in Chile